Harmoniconus is a subgenus  of sea snails, marine gastropod mollusks in the family Conidae, the cone snails and their allies.

In the new classification of the family Conidae by Puillandre N., Duda T.F., Meyer C., Olivera B.M. & Bouchet P. (2015), Harmoniconus has become a subgenus of Conus: Conus (Harmoniconus) da Motta, 1991 (type species: Conus musicus Hwass in Bruguière, 1792) represented as Conus Thiele, 1929

Distinguishing characteristics
The Tucker & Tenorio 2009 taxonomy distinguishes Harmoniconus from Conus in the following ways:

 Genus Conus sensu stricto Linnaeus, 1758
 Shell characters (living and fossil species)
The basic shell shape is conical to elongated conical, has a deep anal notch on the shoulder, a smooth periostracum and a small operculum. The shoulder of the shell is usually nodulose and the protoconch is usually multispiral. Markings often include the presence of tents except for black or white color variants, with the absence of spiral lines of minute tents and textile bars.
Radular tooth (not known for fossil species)
The radula has an elongated anterior section with serrations and a large exposed terminating cusp, a non-obvious waist, blade is either small or absent and has a short barb, and lacks a basal spur.
Geographical distribution
These species are found in the Indo-Pacific region.
Feeding habits
These species eat other gastropods including cones.

 Subgenus Harmoniconus da Motta, 1991
Shell characters (living and fossil species)
The shell is turgid in shape with a low domed spire.  The protoconch is multispiral.  The anal notch is shallow.  The shell does not have an anterior notch.  The shell is either smooth or ornamented with rows of pustules.  The periostracum is smooth, and the operculum is moderate to large.
Radular tooth (not known for fossil species)
The anterior section of the radular tooth is shorter than the length of the posterior section, and the blade is long and covers the length of the anterior section.  A basal spur is present, the barb is short, and the posterior fold and/or terminating cusp are partially external.
Geographical distribution
The species in this genus occur in the Indo-Pacific region, and one species (H. nux) occurs in the Eastern Pacific region.
Feeding habits
These cone snails are vermivorous, meaning that the cones prey on polychaete, Eunicidae and Nereidae worms.

Species list
This list of species is based on the information in the World Register of Marine Species (WoRMS) list. Species within the genus Harmoniconus include:

The following species names are recognized as "alternate representations" (see full explanation below) in contrast to the traditional system, which uses the genus Conus for all species in the family:

 Harmoniconus mcbridei (Lorenz, 2005): synonym of  Conus mcbridei Lorenz, 2005
 Harmoniconus musicus (Hwass in Bruguière, 1792): synonym of  Conus musicus Hwass in Bruguière, 1792
 Harmoniconus nanus (G.B. Sowerby I, 1833): synonym of  Conus nanus G.B. Sowerby I, 1833
 Harmoniconus nux (Broderip, 1833): synonym of  Conus nux Broderip, 1833
 Harmoniconus parvatus (Walls, 1979): synonym of  Conus parvatus Walls, 1979
 Harmoniconus paukstisi Tucker, Tenorio & Chaney, 2011: synonym of Conus (Harmoniconus) paukstisi (Tucker, Tenorio & Chaney, 2011) represented as Conus paukstisi (Tucker, Tenorio & Chaney, 2011)
 Harmoniconus sponsalis (Hwass in Bruguière, 1792): synonym of  Conus sponsalis Hwass in Bruguière, 1792

References

Further reading 
 Kohn A. A. (1992). Chronological Taxonomy of Conus, 1758-1840". Smithsonian Institution Press, Washington and London.
 Monteiro A. (ed.) (2007). The Cone Collector 1: 1-28.
 Berschauer D. (2010). Technology and the Fall of the Mono-Generic Family The Cone Collector 15: pp. 51-54
 Puillandre N., Meyer C.P., Bouchet P., and Olivera B.M. (2011), Genetic divergence and geographical variation in the deep-water Conus orbignyi complex (Mollusca: Conoidea)'', Zoologica Scripta 40(4) 350-363.

External links
  Gastropods.com: Conidae setting forth the genera recognized therein.

Conidae
Gastropod subgenera